Skaidiškės is a village in Vilnius district municipality, Vilnius County, east Lithuania. According to the Lithuanian census of 2021, the town has a population of 4051 people. It is the third largest village in Lithuania.

References

Villages in Vilnius County
Vilnius District Municipality